The 1916 United States Senate election in Minnesota took place on November 7, 1916. It was the first election for either class of U.S. senators held in Minnesota after the ratification of the Seventeenth Amendment to the United States Constitution, which established the popular election of United States senators. Incumbent Senator Moses E. Clapp was defeated in the Republican primary election by former American Bar Association president Frank B. Kellogg. Kellogg went on to defeat former St. Paul Mayor Daniel W. Lawler of the Minnesota Democratic Party, and Prohibition Party challenger Willis Greenleaf Calderwood, in the general election.

Democratic primary

Candidates

Declared
 Alfred J. Davis, Minneapolis resident who worked in real estate, Democratic candidate in Wisconsin for the 3rd CD in 1896, Democratic nominee for Minnesota state House District 43 in 1912
 Daniel W. Lawler, Former U.S. Attorney (1886-1891), former Mayor of St. Paul (1908-1910), Democratic nominee for U.S. Senator in 1893 and 1912

Results

Republican primary

Candidates

Declared
 Moses E. Clapp, Incumbent U.S. Senator since 1901
 Adolph O. Eberhart, 17th Governor of Minnesota (1909-1915), attorney and bank director in Mankato, former state Senator from the 11th District (1903-1907), former Lieutenant Governor (1907-1909)
 Frank B. Kellogg, Former Rochester city attorney (1878-1881), former Olmsted County Attorney (1882-1887), member of the Republican National Committee (1904-1912), former President of the American Bar Association (1912-1913)
 Charles A. Lindbergh, U.S. Representative from Minnesota's 6th congressional district since 1907, former prosecuting attorney of Morrison County (1891-1893)

Results

General election

Results

See also 
 1916 United States Senate elections

References

1916
Minnesota
United States Senate